The twelfth season of the Ukrainian reality talent show Holos Krainy premiered on 23 January, broadcasting every Sunday at 21h (9 p.m) on 1+1. From the previous season, only Nadya Dorofeeva returned as coach, while Potap and Svyatoslav Vakarchuk returned to the show after their two-season and five-season hiatuses, respectively. In the meantime, they were joined by first-time coach, Olya Polyakova.

For this season, the Comeback Stage (which was first introduced in the fifteenth season of American version of The Voice) was introduced under the name "Другий шанс", meaning "Second Chance", and it was exclusively broadcast on the show's official YouTube channel. Hence, for the first time in the Ukrainian version, a fifth coach was added: the duo Andriy Matsola and Oleksandra Zaritska (who was a contestant in season four). To form their team, this duo coach selects contestants who performed in the main competition and failed to advance to the next rounds.

Following the 2022 Russian invasion of Ukraine, the season was suspended after only five episodes were broadcast. However, the show returned on 2 October on a new channel, TET, as 1+1 was only broadcasting emergency news about the war. Episodes six to eleven were initially recorded before 24 February 2022. Due to this, all of the Russian-language dialogue in these episodes was replaced by a voiceover translation in Ukrainian. The show added takes of contestants empowering and inspiring people through music as well as in memory of the soldiers at the frontline.

On 20 November, Mariya Kvitka was named the winner by the public, marking Oleksandra Zaritska & Andriy Matsola's first win as coaches. This is also the first time an artist on the "Second Chance" team won the competition.

Teams 
 Color key

  Winner
  Runner-up
  Eliminated in the Live finale
  Moved to another team
  Eliminated in the Knockouts
  Saved to compete in the "Second Chance"
  Stolen in the Battles
  Eliminated in the Battles
  Eliminated in the "Second Chance" auditions
  Withdrew

Blind auditions 
In the blind auditions (vibor vslepuyu in Ukrainian), each coach should complete their team with a total amount of 16 artists, except Oleksandra & Andriy, who are to choose 14 artists to compete in the "Second Chance".

Episode 1 (23 January)

Episode 2 (30 January)

Episode 3 (6 February)

Episode 4 (13 February)

Episode 5 (20 February)

Special episode (2 October) 
This episode was recorded after the 2022 Russian invasion of Ukraine with contents of the coaches and contestants sending their best wishes to their motherland and regards to the soldiers at the frontline. It also included stories of how they kept empowering and inspiring people through music.

The special episode was broadcast on 2 October, marking the show's return after eight months of suspension. However, TET replaced 1+1 as the new channel broadcasting the remaining episodes of the show.

Episode 6 (9 October)

Episode 7 (16 October)

Battles 
In the battles (boi in Ukrainian), the four coaches pair their contestants to sing a song together, and only one of them advances to the knockouts. The non-stop steal format of the seventh season of the Dutch version of The Voice was implemented in this round. That means artists who end up seated in the 'save room' at the end of the round advance to the next stage. Also, each coach has the chance to save one losing artist from their own team and many of another coach's team.

The "Second Chance" duo coach, Oleksandra & Andriy, saved five artists at the end of the round.

Episode 8 (23 October)

Episode 9 (30 October)

Knockouts 
For the knockouts (nokauty in Ukrainian), all teams have nine artists each and each coach has three seats for the artists they want to move through to the live show to sit down. Usually, the first three artists to perform (a song of their choice) sit in one of those seats. Then, the fate of the following artists will be decided based on whether their coach would like to switch out a seated artist to favor them. After all the artists have performed, those three who end up seated will advance to the live finale.

At the end of the round, Oleksandra & Andriy saved four artists to compete in the "Second Chance". Also, after the knockouts have ended, the public was able to vote for one artist to join Team Oleksandra & Andriy for the live finale. Pavlo Tyutyunnyk from Team Svyatoslav received the most votes and joined the duo coach's team.

Episode 10 (6 November)

Episode 11 (13 November)

Second Chance 
For this season, it was added a brand new phase of competition called "Другий шанс" (in Ukrainian Druhyy shans, meaning "Second Chance") that was exclusive to the show's official YouTube channel. After failing to go through to the next rounds, artists had the chance to be selected by duo coach, Andriy Matsola and Oleksandra Zaritska, to become a member of their team.

Auditions 
The first phase was part of the main show's blind auditions segment and, throughout its seven episodes, Oleksandra & Andriy chose 14 artists that failed to turn a chair.

In each YouTube episode, two artists performed for the duo coach and, as episodes passed, some artists that were previously selected to go further ended up eliminated, as seen in the details table below. Out of them all, only two artists advanced to the next round.

Battles 
In the second round (which was part of the main show's battles segment), the duo coach had to create two battles per episode, and after all episodes, only two artists go through to the knockouts.

In YouTube episode 8, the winners of the auditions (Marta Lyubchyk and Marko Shvaykovsʹkyy) come back to battle against three artists (Dmytro Rotʹkin, Mariya Maksymova, and Tina Kolodiy) that Oleksandra & Andriy saved from the main competition's episode 8. Then, in YouTube episode 9, the winners from episode 8 return and battle against another two artists saved from the main battles (Volodymyr Porubaylo and Yuliya Shtolya).

Knockouts 
For the first episode of the knockouts, the winners from the battles and the two contestants saved on the tenth episode of the main knockouts round (Hlib Parkhomenko and Liya Meladze) sing one song each, and two of them move through to the second part.

For the second episode, the winners of the previous episode and the two contestants saved on the eleventh episode of the main knockouts round (Mariya Kvitka and Marta Lypchey) sing one song each, and two of them would move through to the live show. However, there was a twist: all the contestants actually moved through to the live finale. Liya Meladze was supposed to take part in this episode, but she withdrew from the competition.

Finally, after the knockouts had ended, the public was able to vote for one artist eliminated throughout the whole competition to join Team Oleksandra & Andriy for the live finale. Pavlo Tyutyunnyk from Team Svyatoslav received the most votes and joined the duo coach's team.

Live show 
On this season, there was only one live episode: the finale. For this phase, coach Svyatoslav Vakarchuk did not return to mentor his team members, Aliye Khadzhabadinova, Anna Kindzersʹka, and Mykhaylo Tsar. Hence, these artists were moved into the other coaches' teams: Khadzhabadinova to Team Dorofeeva, Kindzersʹka to Team Olya, and Tsar to Team Potap. This means that all coaches had four artists on their teams. Also, the "Second Chance" Team Oleksandra & Andriy joined as a main team for the live finale.

The show was divided into two rounds. In the first round, all artists performed and one, per team, advanced to the superfinal via the public vote. In round two, the public voted for who they wanted to win the competition.

Episode 12 – Finale (20 November)

Notes

References 

Ukraine
2022 television seasons